The Outrageous Universe Revival Festival (OUR Fest) is an annual summer camping festival which has been hosted by musical group Hypnotic Clambake since 1996. The three-day event features a wide array of musical and other performing artists, including several often-recurring acts, such as Pacific Northwest-based Singer-songwriter Baby Gramps. Creator of the event and Hypnotic Clambake frontman, Maury Rosenberg has touted the OUR Fest's "intimate" nature and explained that the natural beauty of the venue is a major factor contributing to the success of the weekend. The OUR Fest is held at the Kevin Cole Farm in the town of Panama, New York.

References

External links
 Official OUR Fest website
 Official Hypnotic Clambake website
 Brushwood Folklore Center website

Music festivals in New York (state)
Tourist attractions in Chautauqua County, New York